The Kate Duncan Smith DAR School is a K-12 public school in Grant, Alabama.

History
The school was established in 1924 and operates under a public-private partnership between the Marshall County School System and the National Society of the Daughters of the American Revolution.  The historic core of campus covers 15 acres (6 ha) and contains 12 buildings, constructed between 1924 and 1957.  Buildings are constructed in Craftsman style of local stone or logs.  It is one of only two schools in the country (the other being the Tamassee DAR School in South Carolina) that is owned by the DAR.  The historic district was listed on the National Register of Historic Places in 2002.

References

External links

Schools in Marshall County, Alabama
Public K-12 schools in Alabama
National Register of Historic Places in Marshall County, Alabama
School buildings on the National Register of Historic Places in Alabama
Historic districts in Marshall County, Alabama
Daughters of the American Revolution
Historic districts on the National Register of Historic Places in Alabama
1924 establishments in Alabama